Dušan Petković may refer to:

 Dušan Petković (footballer, born 1974), Serbian former footballer
 Dušan Petković (footballer, born 1903) (1903–1979), Serbian and Yugoslav football forward
 Dušan Petković (volleyball) (born 1992), Serbian volleyball player